Chiltern is a town in Victoria, Australia, in the northeast of the state between Wangaratta and Wodonga, in the Shire of Indigo. At the 2021 census, Chiltern had a population of 1,580. It was the birthplace of Prime Minister John McEwan. The town is close to the Chiltern-Mount Pilot National Park. Chiltern was once on the main road between Melbourne and Sydney but is now bypassed by the Hume Freeway running one kilometre to the south.

History 
The area around Chiltern is the traditional lands of the Dhudhuroa people. The nearby Yeddonba Aboriginal Cultural Site, in the Chiltern-Mt Pilot National Park, includes artworks created by the original inhabitants of the Chiltern area, including one ochre painting thought to represent a Thylacine, an animal now extinct and which has been extinct on mainland Australia for thousands of years.

The area of Chiltern was on the Wahgunyah cattle run and was known as Black Dog Creek. The township, named after the Chiltern Hills in England, was surveyed in 1853 but not established until gold discoveries in 1858-59 during the greater Victorian Gold Rush period. The Post Office opened on 1 September 1859.

The Chiltern Magistrates' Court closed on 1 January 1983, not having been visited by a Magistrate since 1972.

Many of Chiltern's buildings are classified by the National Trust. In 1859, many shop-keepers and miners from around Beechworth and the Ovens Valley districts followed the rush and re-located into Chiltern.

The Grape Vine Hotel, on the corners of Main Street and Conness Street, boasts the largest grapevine in Australia, planted in 1867.

Gold

The discovery of gold by John Conness in late 1858 and early 1859, brought a huge shift in population into the Chiltern – Black Dog Creek area. Gold discoveries drew many miners away from the nearby Ovens goldfields; namely Beechworth, Nine Mile Creek and Stanley during the big drought of 1859. Unlike those surface-based sluicing mining operations around Beechworth, the gold around Chiltern was extracted by sinking deep wet leads. These operations required a different type of miner and working groups, capable of sinking shafts to some 400 feet in depth. Miners with these skills and abilities came into the area, from Ballarat and Bendigo and joined with the sluicers from around Beechworth and the Ovens. Miners from the Ballarat goldfields were considered 'radical', because of their connections with the Eureka Rebellion (1854). Some of these miners were colourful characters and the most notable, a colourful and radical A.A. O'Connor, stood for parliament in 1859 as the would-be member for the Ovens; his escapades and the social tensions his candidature aroused appear in O'Brien's book which is cited below.

While Beechworth's gold production declined during 1859, due in part to the drought and lack of water for sluicing, Chiltern's gold production increased (O'Brien), to such an extent that Chiltern looked as if it would usurp the importance of Beechworth. Beechworth was the most important regional centre in North-eastern Victoria during the gold boom of 1852–1859. Chiltern did overshadow Beechworth within a few years, especially when the main Melbourne-Albury rail by-passed Beechworth. Finally, when the gold dwindled during the early 1900s, so did Chiltern.

The town today
The town hosts an antique fair in August and an art show in June. 
The Chiltern-Mount Pilot National Park lies close to the town.

Golfers play at the Chiltern Golf Club on Howlong Road.

The winning clip of the 2009 J Award for Best Music Video of the Year, Alex Roberts' video for Art vs. Science's Parlez-vous Français?, was entirely shot in this town.

Several movies have been shot using Chiltern's well-preserved Victorian-era streetscapes, including Walt Disney's 'Ride a Wild Pony'.

Transport

The railway station on the North East railway line, has V/Line services running between Melbourne and Albury.

Chiltern Football Club
 
Chiltern played its first game of Australian Rules Football against Beechworth in 1876.

Chiltern has an Australian Rules football team that competes in the Tallangatta & District Football League.

Chiltern FC have played in the following official football competitions -
 1893 to 1903 - Ovens & Murray Football League
 1904 - North East Central Football Association
 1905 - Half Day Holiday Football Association
 1906 to 1908 - Ovens & Murray Football League
 1909 - Federal Junior Football Association
 1910 - Ovens & Murray Junior Football Association
 1911 - Rutherglen & District Football Association
 1912 to 1916 - Chiltern & District Football Association
 1917 & 1918 - Chiltern FC in recess, due to World War I
 1919 to 1940 - Chiltern & District Football Association 
 1941 to 1944 - Chiltern FC in recess, due to World War II
 1945 to 1953 - Chiltern & District Football Association
 1954 to 2002 - Ovens & King Football League
 2003 to present day - Tallangatta & District Football League

Senior Football Premierships
 Chiltern & District Football Association
1914, 1922, 1929, 1936, 1940, 1945, 1947, 1948, 1949, 1950, 1951, 1953 (12 total)
 Ovens & King Football League
1957, 1958, 1968, 1971, 1972, 1982, 1983, 1994, 1996, 1998 (10 total)

Notable people 
 Mary Gaunt, novelist, was born here on 21 February 1861.
 Cecil Robert Gaunt, army officer and brother of Mary Eliza Gaunt, was born here in 1863
 Henry Handel Richardson, born in 1870, Chiltern was home for some time in her youth to Australian writer Ethel Richardson who wrote under the pen name Henry Handel Richardson, famous for her book The Getting of Wisdom.
 John McEwen, 18th Prime Minister of Australia was born here on 29 March 1900.
 Barrie Cassidy, former Border Morning Mail newspaper & ABC political journalist grew up in Chiltern.
 Nigel Lappin and cousin, Matthew Lappin, former professional Australian rules footballers, who grew up in Chiltern.

References

 Robert W. P. Ashley, History of the Shire of Chiltern, Thompsons, Albury-Wodonga, 1974.
 Antony O'Brien, Shenanigans on the Ovens Goldfields: the 1859 Election, Artillery Publishing, Hartwell, 2005. (a mining candidate from Chiltern, A. A. O'Connor, stood for this general election during 1859)
 Jennifer Williams, Chiltern Standard Newspaper, 1859-60, M.A. Thesis, University of Melbourne, 1970. This is available in the Melbourne University Reading Room at the Baillieu Library.
 DNRE, Victorian Goldfield Project: Historical Gold Mining Sites in the North East Region of Victoria, 1999

External links

Chiltern, Victoria
1939 - Chiltern & District Football Association: Chiltern FC & Albury FC Seconds team photos
1940 - Chiltern & District Football Association Azzi Medalist: G O'Neill, Chiltern FC
1945 - Chiltern & District Football Association Premiers: Chiltern FC team photo
1950 - Chiltern & District Football Association Premiers: Chiltern FC team photo (undefeated)
1953 - Chiltern & District Football Association Premiers: Chiltern FC team photo

Towns in Victoria (Australia)
Shire of Indigo
Mining towns in Victoria (Australia)
Hume Highway